Jeff Hunt is an Australian long-distance runner. At the 2012 Summer Olympics, he competed in the Men's marathon, finishing in 63rd place.

Achievements

References

External links

Australian male long-distance runners
Australian male marathon runners
Living people
Olympic athletes of Australia
Athletes (track and field) at the 2012 Summer Olympics
Athletes (track and field) at the 2010 Commonwealth Games
1982 births
World Athletics Championships athletes for Australia
Oceanian Athletics Championships winners
Commonwealth Games competitors for Australia
20th-century Australian people
21st-century Australian people